Abu'l-Hasan Ali ibn Sa'd (d. 1485), known as Muley Hacén in Spanish (Muley being derived from Arabic Mawlay = "My Lord"), was the twenty-first Nasrid ruler of the Emirate of Granada in Spain, from 1464 to 1482 and again from 1483 to 1485.

Life

The son of Sa'd, Abu'l-Hasan Ali became sultan in 1464, and in 1477 he refused to pay tribute to the Crown of Castile. In 1481 he ordered an invasion to the city of Zahara de la Sierra by surprise, killing and enslaving the unarmed Christian Zaharans. This action was taken by Isabella I of Castile as a reason to start the war against Granada.

He was the father of Muhammad XII (also known as Boabdil), the last sultan of Granada, by his relative Aixa.

He abandoned Aixa to marry the former Christian slave Isabel de Solís, the daughter of Sancho Jiménez de Solís, Alcalde of La Peña de Martos, who he gave the name Zoraida or Soraya (Thuraya, "Star") after her conversion to Islam and with whom he had two sons.  This marriage caused a scandal. In 1482, he was ousted by a rebellion supported by Aixa and replaced by the son of his first marriage, Boabdil.

He was able to retake the throne in 1483, and reigned a further two years.  He died in 1485, and was succeeded by his brother.  After the defeat of Granada in 1492, Zoraida and her two sons re-converted to Catholicism. The sons took the names of Juan de Granada and Fernando de Granada.

Culture
Mulhacén, the highest mountain of Spain, is named after Abu'l-Hasan Ali.
 
Abu l-Hasan Ali appears as a character, along with Isabel de Solís, in the novel "People of the Book" by Geraldine Brooks, and Part 17 of Washington Irving's Tales of the Alhambra briefly mentions Mula Abul Hassan.

He has also been mentioned by nasim hejazi in his one of the famous novels Shaheen (novel), he was portrayed as brave and Mujahid who is not even ready to pay tribute to Christians as he considers it as a form of slavery and his conscience doesn't permit him to do so.

References

External links
 "Réquiem por Granada" (1991) - DVD

Sultans of Granada
15th-century monarchs in Europe
1485 deaths
Year of birth unknown
People from Granada
15th century in Al-Andalus
15th-century people from al-Andalus
15th-century Arabs